Stanbroke Pastoral Company was a company once owned by AMP Limited that was once one of the largest land owners in Australia.

Properties owned by Stanbroke included; Augustus Downs, Davenport Downs and Tanbar Stations and in Queensland and Banka Banka, Brunchilly, Lake Nash and Helen Springs Station in the Northern Territory.

The company was purchased in 2004 by the Nebo Group who paid 417.5 million plus taking on outstanding debts. The sale was by far the largest rural transaction in Australia's history and included a herd of approximately 5000,000 cattle. The Nebo group were a consortium made up of the founder of Hungry Jack's, Jack Cowin, the nation's largest potato grower, Peter Menegazzo and five prominent pastoral families led by the Fredericks family.
The syndicate fell apart later the same year leaving Menegazzo in charge of the entire business.  Menegazzo bought out his fellow investors for an estimated 340 million. On 2 December 2005, Menegazzo and his wife Angela were killed in a light plane crash in outback New South Wales leaving their four children Brendan, Mark, Deborah and David in charge of the business.

References

Defunct pastoral companies of Australia